The 2012 Shanghai Shenxin F.C. season is Shenxin's 3rd consecutive season in the Chinese Super League. Shenxin will also be competing in the Chinese FA Cup.

Players

Competitions

Chinese Super League

League table

Matches

Chinese FA Cup

References

Shanghai Shenxin F.C. seasons
Shanghai Shenxin F.C.